Mussidia fiorii is a species of snout moth in the genus Mussidia. It was described by G. Cecconi and Joseph de Joannis in 1911 and is known from Eritrea.

References

Moths described in 1911
Phycitinae